William Adams (21 March 1811 – 23 July 1884) was a 19th-century Member of Parliament from Marlborough, New Zealand and the first Superintendent of Marlborough Province.

Early life
Adams was born in Upton, Herefordshire, England, in 1811. He came to New Zealand in 1850, and arrived in Nelson on the Eden. He became one of the runholders in the Wairau Valley.

Politics

He was the first Superintendent of Marlborough Province in 1860, following the separation from the Nelson Province.

He represented the Picton electorate from 1867 to 1868, when he resigned.

Death
Adams died on 23 July 1884. He is buried on his homestead Langley Dale on the north bank of the Wairau River. He was survived by his wife and four sons, including Acton Adams.

References

1811 births
1884 deaths
New Zealand MPs for South Island electorates
Superintendents of New Zealand provincial councils
Members of the New Zealand House of Representatives
Members of the Marlborough Provincial Council
People from Herefordshire
English emigrants to New Zealand
19th-century New Zealand politicians